Agoseris heterophylla is a liguliferous species in the family Asteraceae known by the common name annual agoseris or mountain dandelion. It is widespread in mostly drier regions of western North America from British Columbia to Baja California.

Description
This is an annual herb producing a basal rosette of leaves. The oblanceolate leaves may be toothed, pinnatifid, or entire, and no larger than 15 cm long and 1.5 cm wide.   Often there is no stem, or a short, rudimentary stem may develop, although the plant will produce several stem-like peduncles. Each solitary flower head contains one or two rows of sharp-pointed bracts, often with purplish hairs; and a corolla of yellow ray florets, but no disc florets. The fruit is an achene which can be highly variable but typically has a long beak and a terminal pappus of white bristles. Flowers bloom March to September.

Varieties
Agoseris heterophylla var. cryptopleura - California
Agoseris heterophylla var. heterophylla - British Columbia to Baja California (including Guadalupe Island)
Agoseris heterophylla var. quentinii - Arizona, New Mexico

References

External links

Calflora Database: Agoseris heterophylla (Annual agoseris,  Annual mountain dandelion)
USDA Plants Profile
Calphotos Photo gallery, University of California

heterophylla
Flora of the Northwestern United States
Flora of the Southwestern United States
Flora of British Columbia
Flora of California
Flora of New Mexico
Flora of the Cascade Range
Flora of the Sierra Nevada (United States)
Flora of Baja California
Flora of Mexican Pacific Islands
Natural history of the California chaparral and woodlands
Natural history of the California Coast Ranges
Natural history of the Transverse Ranges
Plants described in 1841
Taxa named by Edward Lee Greene
Taxa named by Thomas Nuttall
Flora without expected TNC conservation status